() is a moshav in central Israel, and a biblical location mentioned in the Books of Joshua and Judges and in the first Book of Chronicles.

History

Antiquity
In 2013, archaeological excavations conducted by the Israel Antiquities Authority near  discovered the oldest structure ever found in the Shfela region of the Judean Hills, dating back to the first permanent human settlement in the area some 10,000 years ago. Excavations at the site continued into 2014, led by A. Yaroshevich on behalf of the Israel Antiquities Authority.

Biblical era
 was in the territory allotted to the Tribe of Dan, and located on the border of the tribe of Judah. According to the biblical narrative, Samson began to be agitated by the Spirit of God in the locality of Mahaneh Dan (the camp of Dan), the district "between Zorah and ".

Modern 
It was part of a plan to establish settlements in the Jerusalem corridor in order to create a contiguous bloc between the coastal plain and Jerusalem. The first residents were Jewish immigrants from Yemen, who settled there in December 1949. They worked in land reclamation and forestry. Later, the moshav branched out into poultry and other agricultural enterprises. At the end of the 1990s, the moshav absorbed 100 new families.

Gallery

See also
Eshtaol Forest
Cities in the Book of Joshua

References

Bibliography
Golani, Amir  (27/11/2008):  Eshta’ol, Hadashot Arkheologiyot – Excavations and Surveys in Israel, No. 120.
Solimany, Gideon  (11/03/2009): Eshta’ol Junction, Hadashot Arkheologiyot – Excavations and Surveys in Israel, No. 121.
Golani, Amir  and Dan Storchan (01/01/2009): Eshta’ol, Hadashot Arkheologiyot – Excavations and Surveys in Israel, No. 121.
Freikman, Michael  (23/07/2010): Eshta’ol, Hadashot Arkheologiyot – Excavations and Surveys in Israel, No. 122.
Storchan, Dan (20/12/2010): Eshta’ol, Survey of Sha‘ar Ha-Gāy–Hartuv Junctions, Hadashot Arkheologiyot – Excavations and Surveys in Israel, No. 122.
Storchan, Dan  (22/11/2012): Eshta’ol, Hadashot Arkheologiyot – Excavations and Surveys in Israel, No. 124.

External links

Moshav website 

Moshavim
Populated places established in 1949
Populated places in Jerusalem District
Yemeni-Jewish culture in Israel
Ancient Jewish settlements of Judaea
1949 establishments in Israel